The Parker Trio was a Southern Gospel music group founded in 1995. The group originated from Pickering, Ontario but was based in Nashville, Tennessee and most of its performances were in the US. The group initially consisted of Warren Parker, his wife Shannan Parker, and Vanessa Young. In 2004, Young left the group and was replaced by Angie White, whose husband Brandt White was their tour bus driver and sound technician. On January 8, 2006, Warren Parker was struck by a truck and killed while touring with the trio in South Carolina.
The group released five CDs, including a live concert DVD, recorded in Havana, Illinois. Their albums won several Gospel Music Association of Canada Covenant Awards and Shai Awards. While on tour, the group ministered in churches, and many different types of venues, including many prisons and drug rehabilitation centres; they were known to perform as many as 260 concerts a year.

Discography

Albums 
 A Chapter In Time
 With Wings As Eagles (as Warren & Shannan Parker), 2000, Song Garden Records
 Love Remains (2002), Song Garden Records
 Tearin' Down The Walls (2004) 
 Live in Havana (2005), Independent

Video 
 Live in Havana DVD

Awards

GMA Canada Covenant Awards 

 1994 Favourite Instrumentalist Of The Year: Warren Parker
 1998 Favourite Instrumentalist Of The Year: Warren Parker
 1999 Favourite Instrumentalist Of The Year: Warren Parker
 2000 Favourite Instrumentalist Of The Year: Warren Parker
 2000 Favourite Vocal Group Of The Year: Parker Trio
 2001 Favourite Vocal Group Artist Of The Year: Parker Trio
 2001 Favourite Instrumentalist Artist Of The Year: Warren Parker
 2001 Favourite Song Of The Year: "With Wings As Eagles" (Warren and Shannan Parker)
 2001 nominee, Southern Gospel Album Of The Year: With Wings As Eagles
 2001 nominee, Southern Gospel Song Of The Year: "With Wings As Eagles"
 2001 nominee, Favourite Female Artist of the Year: Shannan Parker
 2003 Southern Gospel Album Of The Year: Love Remains (Parker Trio)
 2003 Southern Gospel Song Of The Year: "Thank God For Calvary"
 2005 Southern Gospel Album Of The Year: Live in Havana (Parker Trio)

References

External links 
 Parker Trio Official Website
 Warren Parker remembrance at SGM Radio

Musical groups with year of establishment missing 
Musical groups from Ontario
Canadian gospel music groups
Southern gospel performers